Bertha Elisa Noeggerath Cárdenas, better known as Dulce, (Matamoros, Tamaulipas, in July 29, 1955) is a Mexican singer and actress.

Early life 
She moved to Monterrey, Nuevo León, to study psychology. She began her musical career there with the band Toby and his friends on September 15, 1974. Later, with the support of the singer José José, she began working as a soloist in Mexico City. She traveled to Spain in 1978, to compete in the Mallorca Festival with the song "Señor amor" (Sir love).

References

Living people
1955 births
Mexican women singers
Mexican actresses